Staryye Kazanchi (İśke Qaźansı) is a rural locality (a selo) and the administrative center of Kazanchinsky Selsoviet, Askinsky District, Bashkortostan, Russia. The population was 631 as of 2010. There are 9 streets.

Geography 
Staryye Kazanchi is located 33 km northwest of Askino (the district's administrative centre) by road. Yarmankul is the nearest rural locality.

References 

Rural localities in Askinsky District